Convergence for Social Democracy (in French: Convergence pour la Démocratie Sociale, CDS) is a Sankarist political party in Burkina Faso.
It was founded in December 2002 as split from the Union of Independent Democrats and Progressives. It is led by Djéjouma Sanon.

Political parties in Burkina Faso
Sankarist political parties in Burkina Faso